Balkot is located in Bhaktapur District in the Bagmati Provience of central Nepal. In 2015,  it was merged with Sirutar, Gundu and Dadhikot to form Anantalingeshowr Municipality. In March 2017, under new local level restructuring, Anantalingeswor Municipality is merged with Suryabinayak Municipality.
Currently, former Primeminister of Nepal KP Sharma Oli live in Balkot.
The 2011 Nepal census shows it had a population of 15,881 with 3,999 houses.

References

Populated places in Bhaktapur District